Morgan Sackett is an American director and producer. He has won two Primetime Emmy Awards and been nominated for 12 more in the categories Outstanding Comedy Series, Outstanding Short Form Comedy, Drama or Variety Series and Outstanding Directing for a Comedy Series for his work on the television programs Parks and Recreation, Veep, The Good Place and Hacks.

Sackett will be executive producer for the new IMDb TV television series Primo, along with David Miner.

References

External links 

Living people
Place of birth missing (living people)
Year of birth missing (living people)
American television producers
American television directors
Hugo Award winners
Primetime Emmy Award winners